Veer Singh Patel (born 1980) is an Indian politician and former MLA representing the Chitrakoot constituency in Uttar Pradesh as a Samajwadi Party member from 2012 to 2017. He is the son of dacoit Dadua (Shiv Kumar Patel) who was killed in 2007.

Politics
Patel got active in politics after his father Dadua died in an encounter with the Uttar Pradesh Police on 22 July 2007.

In 2016, he got into controversy for beating up an officer from the electricity department because the officer didn't agree to forgive or reduce the bills of his supporters.

Patel lost the 2017 and 2022 Uttar Pradesh Legislative Assembly election from Chitrakoot and Manikpur respectively.

He also lost the 2019 Lok Sabha election from Khajuraho. He got just 40,077 votes, while the winner V. D. Sharma of BJP got 8,11,135 votes.

Criminal charges
In his election affidavit of 2022, Patel mentioned that he has 11 criminal cases upon him including kidnapping. Out of 11 cases, he has been convicted in one case in 2009.

Family
His uncle Bal Kumar Patel is a former Lok Sabha MP and Ram Singh Patel (MLA) is his cousin.

References 

Living people
Uttar Pradesh politicians
Samajwadi Party politicians
Samajwadi Party politicians from Uttar Pradesh
1980 births